This page provides supplementary chemical data on toluene.

MSDS sheets

Structure and properties

Thermodynamic properties

Vapor pressure of liquid

Spectral data

References

External links
 NIST website
 Physical and Chemical Properties of Toluene in chemeo.com

Chemical data pages
Chemical data pages cleanup